Bartłomiej Smuczyński (born 25 August 1995) is a Polish footballer who plays for Liga Okręgowa club Wieczysta Kraków.

Career
In January 2020, Smuczyński moved to Liga Okręgowa club Wieczysta Kraków.

References

External links
 
 

Polish footballers
1995 births
Living people
Ekstraklasa players
I liga players
Lechia Gdańsk players
Kolejarz Stróże players
Bruk-Bet Termalica Nieciecza players
KSZO Ostrowiec Świętokrzyski players
People from Starogard County
Association football wingers